ISO/IEC 14755 is a joint ISO and IEC standard for input methods to enter characters defined in ISO/IEC 10646, the international standard corresponding to the Unicode Standard. As the repertoires of ISO/IEC 10646 and the Unicode Standard are identical, ISO/IEC 14755 therefore also describes methods for inputting Unicode characters. The standard was developed by ISO/IEC JTC 1/SC 35 User interfaces, and was published in August 1997.

The standard describes four methods to handle ISO/IEC 10646 or Unicode characters:

 A beginning key sequence (such as Ctrl+Shift) followed by an alphanumeric code shall result in the input of the corresponding Unicode character.
 Code values of characters displayed on the screen can be retrieved by selecting a character and then hitting a key.
 Lists of possibly related characters can be displayed to let users select the one they want to input by the shape of its glyph rather than by its code value.
 Finally, the arrow characters etched onto function keys, such as Tab or Backspace, can be input by pressing the relevant function key after a beginning key sequence (such as Ctrl+Shift), without knowing the codes. That is to say, the beginning key sequence leaves the keyboard in a logical state where pressing any function key combination will potentially generate a character instead of activating the associated function.

See also 
 Unicode input

References

External links 
  ISO/IEC JTC1/SC 18/WG 9 N, ISO/IEC 14755 - Input methods to enter characters from the repertoire of ISO/IEC 10646 with a keyboard or other input devices, Final text, 13 December 1996.

14755
Unicode
Input methods